Charlie Aldridge (born 3 April 2001) is a British mountain bike cross country cyclist from Scotland. He was the 2019 junior World Champion and 2022 British national champion.

Personal life
Aldridge was born in Perth, Scotland and lives in Crieff. He was a student of Mechanical Engineering at Edinburgh University.

Career
Aldridge won gold at the 2019 UCI Mountain Bike World Championships held in Mont-Sainte-Anne, Canada in the junior cross country competition. At that championships he was also part of the relay team that finished sixth overall. 

In May, 2022 he won the British National Mountain Biking Championships u23 title at Cannock Chase. It was raced on the same course that would be used for the 2022 Commonwealth Games where Aldridge was chosen to compete for Scotland. The familiarity of this gave him confidence to strive for a medal. However, at the Games Aldridge was looking on course for a bronze medal on the penultimate lap when he had a mechanical issue following a crash. His bike lost it’s rear derailleur and he ended up finishing sixteenth. 

In June, 2022 he won the European Continental Championships XCO U23 race in Anadia, Portugal. In July, 2022 he won bronze at the 2022 UCI Mountain Bike World Cup u23 event in Lenzerheide, Switzerland. He was named in the Britain squad for the UCI Mountain Bike World Championships in Les Gets, France in August 2022.

Major results

2018
 Junior National XC Series
1st Dalby Forest
1st Kentford
2nd Builth Wells
 2nd Cross-country, National Junior Championships
2019
 1st  Cross-country, UCI World Junior Championships
 Junior Swiss Bike Cup
1st Andermatt
 1st Overall Junior National XC Series
1st Sherwood Pines
1st Hadleigh Park
1st Cannock Chase
2021
 2nd Cross-country, National Under-23 Championships
2022
 UEC European Championships
1st  Short track
2nd  Under-23 Cross-country
 National Championships
1st  Short track
1st  Under-23 Cross-country
 1st  Overall National XC Series
1st Tong
1st Cannock Chase
2nd Newcastleton
2nd Fowey
 UCI Under-23 XCO World Cup
3rd Lenzerheide
 3rd Jelenia Góra
2023
 Greek Series
3rd Salamis

References

2001 births
British male cyclists
Cross-country mountain bikers
Living people
Scottish sportsmen
Cyclists at the 2022 Commonwealth Games
British mountain bikers
21st-century British people